The men's triple jump event at the 1961 Summer Universiade was held at the Vasil Levski National Stadium in Sofia, Bulgaria, on 3 September 1961.

Results

References

Athletics at the 1961 Summer Universiade
1961